Alphabetical list of Protestantism-related articles on English Wikipedia.

A 
 Agonoclita
 Amish
 Anabaptism
 Anglicanism
 Anti-Protestantism
 Arminianism

B 
 Baptists
 Beguines and Beghards
 Bible
 Bogomilism
 Bosnian Church
 Brethren of the Free Spirit

C 
 Calvinism
 Catharism
 Creationism
 Christendom

D 
 Diet of Nuremberg
 Donatism
 Dulcinian

E 
 Evangelicalism

F 
 Faith and rationality

G 
 Great Awakenings
 God
 Gospel

H 
 History of Protestantism
 Hubmaier, Balthasar
 Hussites

I 
 Iconoclasm

J 
 Judeo-Christian

K

L 
 Left Behind
 List of Protestant authors
 List of the largest Protestant churches of the world
 Lollardy
 Lord's Prayer
 Lutheranism

M 
 Melanchthon, Philip
 Methodism

N 
 Nestorianism
 New Testament
 Nicene Creed

O 
 Old Testament

P 
 Pentecostalism
 Presbyterianism
 Protestant culture

Q 
 Quakers

R 
 Radical Reformation
 Reformation
 Restorationism

S 
 Salvation Army, The
 Shakers

T 
 ten Boom, Corrie
 Trinity

U 
 Utraquists

V 
 Voegelin, Eric

W 
 Wesley, Charles
 Wesley, John

X

Y 
 Yehowists

Z 
 Zwingli, Huldrych

Index of Protestantism
Protestantism-related topics
Index